José Mariano Chaves y Castillo (or Mariano Chávez) (31 December 1799 – May 1845) was a wealthy Spanish-American landowner who was the acting governor of New Mexico for a few months during 1844.
Chaves County, New Mexico is named after him.

Family
José Mariano Chaves was born on 31 December 1799, the son of New Mexico Governor Francisco Xavier Chávez (1822–1823), a descendant of don Pedro Durán de Chávez, a conquistador from the Extremadura province of Spain.  The governor José Antonio Chaves (1829–1832) was another prominent member of the Chávez family in New Mexico.

Mariano Chaves was a member of the New Mexican landowning elite. An Anglo-American visitor to Santa Fe in 1846 described the wealth displayed in his house, which was furnished with Brussels carpets, white marble tables, gilt framed mirrors and candelabras.

Mariano Chaves married Dolores Perea, daughter of Pedro Jose Perea, a descendant of an early New Mexico settler.  Their son José Francisco Chaves served three terms in the United States House of Representatives as Delegate from the New Mexico Territory, 1865 to 1871.

After Mariano's death, Dolores Perea married the prosperous trader Henry Connelly in 1849.  Dr. Connelly was governor of New Mexico Territory during the American Civil War.

Career
Mariano Chaves was acting political chief in 1835 after Francisco Sarracino had left office, holding this position until Albino Pérez became political chief. He was chief of staff of Governor Manuel Armijo during the revolt of 1837. He became inspector general of the New Mexico military forces.

In 1840 he served as political chief. In September 1841 a force of Texans entered New Mexico heading for Santa Fe. They were captured by superior Mexican forces and forced to march south to Mexico City, suffering ill treatment on the journey. Chaves provided assistance to the prisoners in the form of blankets and provisions.

In April 1843 Mariano's younger brother, the trader Antonio José Chaves, was travelling along the Santa Fe Trail between Santa Fe and Independence, Missouri when he was attacked, robbed and murdered by a party of Texans.
The killers were caught by U.S. troops and the leaders put to death, largely due to the influence of Chaves.

Early in 1844, Governor Manuel Armijo decided to give up active involvement in the governor position, and appointed Mariano Chaves as gobernado interino (acting governor) as of 31 January 1844.  Mariano Chaves resigned on 10 April due to illness. Felipe Sena, President of the Departmental Assembly, then became acting governor, although Armijo remained governor.

In March 1844, General Santa Anna removed Armijo from office and appointed the commandante militar, Mariano Martínez de Lejarza, as "constitutional governor".  Martinez assumed office at the end of April and held the position until 1 May 1845.

José Mariano Chaves died in May 1845.

References
Citations

Sources

Governors of New Mexico
Mexican governors of Santa Fe de Nuevo México
1799 births
1845 deaths
19th-century American politicians